Alamos F.C. is a Mexican football club founded in 1994 that plays in the Liga TDP. The club is based in Mexico City and is the oldest subsidiary of C.D. Guadalajara.

History
The club was founded in 1994  as a reserve squad for C.D. Guadalajara and played under the name Chivas Alamos. The club has participated in all basic force level tournaments since 1995 and currently plays in the Tercera División de México.

See also
Football in Mexico

Honors
Tercera División de México 4th Group (1):2009-2010

External links

References 

Football clubs in the State of Mexico
Association football clubs established in 1994
1994 establishments in Mexico